Amala Shankar (née Nandy, 27 June 1919 – 24 July 2020)  was an Indian danseuse. She was the wife of dancer and choreographer Uday Shankar and mother of musician Ananda Shankar and dancer  Mamata Shankar (later she became an actress)  and sister-in-law of musician and composer Ravi Shankar. Amala Shankar acted in the film Kalpana written, co-produced and directed by husband Uday Shankar. She died on Friday, 24 July 2020, in West Bengal's Kolkata, India aged 101.

Biography 
Amala Shankar was born as Amala Nandy on 27 June 1919 in Batajor Village of Magura District. Her father Akhoy Kumar Nandy wanted his children to be interested in nature and villages. In 1931, when she was 11 years old she went to the International Colonial Exhibition in Paris. Here she met Uday Shankar and his family. Amala at that time was wearing a frock. Uday Shankar's mother Hemangini Devi gave her a Saree to wear. She joined Uday Shankar's dance troupe and performed across the world. 

In 1939 when she was staying in Chennai with Uday Shankar's dance group, one day came to Amala at night and gave her marriage proposal. Uday Shankar married Amala in 1942. Their first son Ananda Shankar was born in December 1942. Their daughter Mamata Shankar was born in January 1955. Uday Shankar and Amala Shankar was a popular dance couple for a long time. But, later Uday Shankar was romantically involved with a young girl of his troupe and he produced Chandalika without Amala. Uday Shankar died in 1977. The last few years, the couple lived separately.  Amala Shankar was still active and has kept Shankar gharana alive with her daughter Mamata and daughter-in-law Tanushree Shankar. She was the sister-in-law of Ravi Shankar, who was a Sitarist.  Remaining active until her nineties, her last performance was the dance drama Sita Swayamvar at the age of 92, in which she played the role of King Janaka.

Kalpana 

Amala Shankar acted in the film Kalpana (1948). The film was written, co-produced and directed by Uday Shankar, who also appeared in the film. Amala played the character of Uma. Amala Shankar attended the 2012 Cannes Film Festival where the film was screened. Amala Shankar said in an interview–
"2012 Cannes Film Festival... I was the youngest film star at the Cannes Film Festival... I am revisiting Cannes after a span of 81 years..."

Filmography

References 

 Eminent danseuse Amala Shankar passes away at 101 in Kolkata. The Hindu. 24 July 2020.
 The Indian Express https://indianexpress.com/article/express-sunday-eye/dancing-with-the-star-100-year-old-amala-shankar-legacy-uday-shankar-5248647/

External links 

Bengali women artists
Dancers from West Bengal
Indian female dancers
Women artists from West Bengal
20th-century Indian dancers
20th-century Indian women artists
Actresses in Hindi cinema
Indian film actresses
20th-century Indian actresses
Indian centenarians
Women centenarians
People from Magura District
Bengali people
1919 births
2020 deaths